Hellinsia speideli is a moth of the family Pterophoridae. It is known from Palawan, Samar and Luzon in the Philippines.

The wingspan is 13–15 mm. Adults are on wing in March and April.

References

speideli
Moths of the Philippines
Moths described in 2003